Sheila Edmunds (née Stocks) is a former Doncaster Rovers Belles player. Sheila Stocks is the founder of Doncaster Rovers Belles. Sheila Stocks played for Doncaster Rovers Belles for 25 years and retired in 1994.

Personal life

Sheila Stocks later married Paul Edmunds who was the Doncaster Belles coach.

Honours
Doncaster Belles
 FA Women's Cup: 1982–83, 1986–87, 1987–88, 1989–90, 1991–92, 1993–94

Bibliography

References

Living people
FA Women's National League players
Doncaster Rovers Belles L.F.C. players
English women's footballers
Women's association football defenders
Year of birth missing (living people)